Philip John Keoghan  (born 31 May 1967) is a New Zealand television personality, best known for hosting the American version of The Amazing Race on CBS, since its 2001 debut. He is the creator and host of No Opportunity Wasted, which has been produced in the United States, New Zealand, and Canada. He also co-created and hosts the American reality competition television program Tough as Nails which debuted on CBS on 8 July 2020. As of 2021, he has been involved with winning ten Primetime Emmy Awards related to his work on The Amazing Race, where the show consecutively won the Outstanding Reality-Competition Program seven times.

Early life
Keoghan was born in Lincoln, a satellite town of Christchurch, New Zealand. Due to his father's career, Keoghan spent a considerable part of his childhood in Antigua and Canada. His family had returned to Christchurch by the time he was in high school, and following that, he attended St Andrew's College, Christchurch.

Television

While completing a TV cameraman apprenticeship, Keoghan successfully auditioned for the New Zealand children's show Spot On at age 19. After a series of further presenter work in New Zealand television, including as a reporter on That's Fairly Interesting, he, at 23, and his wife Louise left for the United States after his show Keoghan's Heroes was picked up by a U.S. network.

Keoghan originally auditioned for the host of Survivor. Though he made the shortlist, the CBS network ultimately chose Jeff Probst for Survivor, and offered Keoghan the hosting duties for The Amazing Race. Keoghan has been host for the show from its inception and also serves as a producer. He currently has a contract extending for "several years" following The Amazing Race 18 in 2011 that will allow him to also develop other shows for CBS. In a 2002 interview, he admitted that his pay for a single episode of The Amazing Race is more than an entire year on Spot On.

Shortly after the February 2011 Christchurch earthquake, Keoghan visited his hometown to ensure his family was safe but also to record segments for The Early Show to implore viewers to provide aid to the New Zealand Red Cross and to promote continued tourism, a fundamental part of New Zealand's economy, to the country. At the same time, he participated in recording Air New Zealand's new safety video for its domestic jet fleet. Keoghan has hosted over 1,000 different programme episodes.

In June 2010, it was announced that Keoghan would host and produce a new reality series about the Velux 5 Oceans Race. He told TMZ in 2010 that during the 10th season of The Amazing Race he was detained in Ukraine for two days until the U.S. ambassador in Ukraine intervened to free him.

Keoghan hosted National Geographic Explorer starting in the show's 11th season, to start airing in 2018. According to Keoghan, he had wanted to produce for Explorer and he and his wife-to-be had even filmed and submitted a pitch tape to the show's production at that time.

No Opportunity Wasted
While 19 and filming for Spot On, Keoghan and a partner dived down to the shipwreck of the MS Mikhail Lermontov,  underwater. During filming, he was separated from his partner in the ship's ballroom and suffered a panic attack, considering it a near-death experience. He was rescued by his dive partner, and though shaken, insisted on facing his fear and returned the next day to complete filming. From then on, Keoghan set out to live his life to the fullest by accomplishing exotic goals and taking risks, creating a "No Opportunity Wasted" (NOW) list of activities he wanted to complete in his life; In his book No Opportunity Wasted, Keoghan wrote:

Since then, Keoghan has broken a world bungee jumping record, gone diving in the world's longest underwater caves, eaten a meal on top of an erupting volcano, and renewed his vows underwater while feeding sharks. He was a guest on The Oprah Winfrey Show, where he shared with Oprah his list of things he wants to do before he dies. 

Keoghan co-developed the television show No Opportunity Wasted, initially premiering in 2004, that reflected on this "No Opportunity Wasted" mantra. He also wrote a companion book, No Opportunity Wasted: 8 Ways to Create a List for the Life You Want.

Cycling
Keoghan is an avid cyclist. From 28 March to 9 May 2009, Keoghan performed in "Ride Across America", in partnership with several organisations including GNC, to raise money for multiple sclerosis research. Keoghan stopped in 39 cities en route, attending various events and participating in casting for season 15 of The Amazing Race; the ride culminated a day before the finale of season 14. The event raised $500,000, with over $400,000 coming from in-store donations during the ride. His documentary movie The Ride about his ride across America, premiered on 3 February 2011.

Keoghan later came across information about Harry Watson, an early-20th-century New Zealand cyclist that formed a team of four to become the first English-speaking team to ride in the Tour de France in 1928. Looking to celebrate Watson's legacy, Keoghan prepared to ride the same Tour de France course from 1928 (then, 22 legs at nearly  compared to the modern Tour at ), using the same type of gear-less bicycle as Watson and his team used, outside of using a modern riding seat. He and his riding partner Ben Cornell completed the ride in 2013, with their progress filmed by Keoghan's wife Louise and others. The footage was assembled for another film called Le Ride, which premiered in the Isaac Theatre Royal in Christchurch at the New Zealand Film Festival in July 2016.

Personal life
John Keoghan, Phil's father, is an agricultural scientist involved with conservation in New Zealand. He appeared alongside his son as a Pit Stop greeter during the 13th season of The Amazing Race when the racers stopped in New Zealand. John Keoghan and his wife run a bed and breakfast in Rolleston, New Zealand.

Keoghan's brother Andrew was a television reporter on Television New Zealand's One News and is a jazz singer. His sister, Ruth Keoghan Cooper, specialises in coaching, training and development programmes for professional women who wish to combine careers with motherhood.

Keoghan currently lives with his wife and producing partner Louise Keoghan (née Rodrigues), and their daughter. Louise is an Australian-born television producer & director and co-creator of No Opportunity Wasted and Tough as Nails.  They currently reside in Los Angeles, California. They also have homes in Matarangi on the Coromandel Peninsula, and in Westport.

Awards
Keoghan was recognised in 2012 as one of six "Emerging Leaders" during the Sir Peter Blake Leadership Awards, due to his use of his celebrity status to support efforts such as Christchurch earthquake relief and efforts for multiple sclerosis.

In 2008, Keoghan was awarded the World Class New Zealand award in the 'Creative' category.

In the 2014 New Year Honours, Keoghan was appointed a Member of the New Zealand Order of Merit, for services as a television presenter and to tourism.

For his hosting of The Amazing Race, Keoghan was nominated for the 2009 Primetime Emmy Award for Outstanding Host for a Reality or Reality-Competition Program in the second year of the award's creation but lost to Jeff Probst of Survivor.

Shows
Keoghan has worked in more than seventy countries as a television host, producer, writer, and cameraman. Some of the shows Keoghan has been involved with include:
 3.45 Live (1990) – Presenter
 The Amazing Race (2001–present) – Host
 Best of Both Worlds – Co-host
 Breakfast Time (FX TV series) – Road Warrior
 The Early Show – Travel Correspondent
 FOX After Breakfast (1996) – Reporter
 That's Fairly Interesting – Reporter
 [[Go for It (TY series)|Go For It]] – Host
 The Human Edge (2002) – Co-creator
 Phil Keoghan's Adventure Crazy – Co-creator
 Adventure Crazy – Host
 Keoghan's Heroes – Co-creator
 Miss World 2003 (2003) – Host
 No Opportunity Wasted (2004) – Host
 Spot On – Host
 Surprise, Surprise – Host
 Whose House is it Anyway? (2000) – Host
 Speed Test Drive (2006) – Cameo appearance as a student of the Jim Russell Racing School
 Everest: After the Climb (2007) – Host
 CBS News Sunday Morning (2008) – Contributor
 Star Trek: Phase II (2008) – Cameo as Admiral Keoghan in "Blood & Fire" Part One
 Million Dollar Password (2008) – Guest appearance/Himself
 I Get That a Lot (2013) – Himself
 Big Brother (2015) – Takeover guest who revealed The Amazing Race 26 alums Jeff and Jackie as the final two HouseGuests.
 Earth Live (2017) – Co-host with Jane Lynch
 American Dad! (2017) – Guest voice as host of "The Bitchin' Race" in the episode "The Bitchin' Race"
 National Geographic Explorer (2018) – Host
 Tough as Nails (2020–present) – Host, Executive Producer, Director, Co-Creator

See also
 List of New Zealand television personalities

References

External links

 
 Upfront: Phil Keoghan New Zealander Listener, 22 October 2005
 Profile on Phil Keoghan, Te Kete Ipurangi
 No Opportunity Wasted
 Phil Keoghan on The Hour
 Phil Rides Across America

1967 births
Living people
American game show hosts
Television producers from California
New Zealand television presenters
New Zealand expatriates in the United States
Participants in American reality television series
People from Lincoln, New Zealand
People from Los Angeles
People educated at St Andrew's College, Christchurch
Members of the New Zealand Order of Merit
Primetime Emmy Award winners